Carp River is a  river in Marquette County in the U.S. state of Michigan.

The river flows generally east, emptying into Marquette Bay of Lake Superior at  near the Marquette Branch Prison on the south side of the city of Marquette.

Tributaries and features 
From the mouth:
 (right) Morgan Creek (also known as Gordons Creek and Little Carp River)
 Morgan Falls
 Lower Carp River Fall
 Morgan Pond
 Carp River Lake
 (left) Mud Lake (also known as Beaver Creek Meadow and Beaver Meadow)
 Upper Carp River Falls
 (right) Picket Lake
 (right) Nealy Creek
 Deer Lake
 Gold Mine Creek
 North Lake
 Cooper Creek
 Cooper Lake
 Carp Creek
 (left) Larson Creek

Drainage basin 
The drainage basin of the Carp River includes portions of the following:
 In Marquette County:
 Ely Township
 City of Ishpeming
 Ishpeming Township
 City of Marquette
 Marquette Township
 City of Negaunee
 Negaunee Township
 Sands Township
 Tilden Township
Fish 
Brook Trout

References 

Rivers of Michigan
Rivers of Marquette County, Michigan
Tributaries of Lake Superior